

Countess of Brunswick 
Lüneburg became a part of the County after Emperor Lothair, who inherited it from the Billungs.

Duchess of Brunswick-Lüneburg

Main line

Wolfenbüttel line

Grubenhagen line

Göttingen line

Calenberg line

Calenberg-Göttingen line

Bevern line

Lüneburg-Celle line

Harburg line 
Harburg was a barony, not a duchy

Gifhorn line

Dannenberg line

Duchess of Brunswick

Sources
BRUNSWICK

 
Brunswick-Luneburg
Brunswick